Hermanus Siert Adolf "Hemmie" Vriens (born 10 June 1944) is a retired Dutch swimmer. He competed at the 1964 Summer Olympics in the 200 m breaststroke and 4 × 100 m medley relay but failed to reach the finals.

References

1944 births
Living people
Dutch male breaststroke swimmers
Olympic swimmers of the Netherlands
Swimmers at the 1964 Summer Olympics
Sportspeople from Breda